John Belton (died 23 February 1963) was an Irish politician, builder and publican. He was first elected to Dáil Éireann as a Fine Gael Teachta Dála (TD) for the Dublin North-East constituency at the 1948 general election. He was re-elected at the 1951, 1954, 1957 and 1961 general elections. He died in office in February 1963 and the by-election held on 30 May 1963 was won by his brother Paddy Belton. He served as Lord Mayor of Dublin from 1950 to 1951.

Other members of the Belton family to have served in the Oireachtas include his father Patrick Belton, his brother Richard Belton and his niece Avril Doyle.

See also
Families in the Oireachtas

References

 

Year of birth missing
1963 deaths
Fine Gael TDs
Lord Mayors of Dublin
Members of the 13th Dáil
Members of the 14th Dáil
Members of the 15th Dáil
Members of the 16th Dáil
Members of the 17th Dáil
Politicians from County Dublin
Belton family
Burials at St. Fintan's Cemetery, Sutton